Sounding the Seventh Trumpet is the debut studio album by American heavy metal band Avenged Sevenfold, released on July 24, 2001, through Good Life Recordings. The album was later reissued on March 19, 2002, through Hopeless Records, featuring a slightly different cover art. Although the album only sold 300 copies in its first week of release, it has sold 370,000 copies worldwide, with 310,000 sold in the United States, as of November 2010. 

The title 'Sounding the Seventh Trumpet' takes its name from the Book of Revelation, specifically referencing chapter 11 and the sounding of the last (seventh) trumpet, showing the end of the world. Valary DiBenedetto (M. Shadows' future wife) performs vocals on the track "The Art of Subconscious Illusion." The album was released on vinyl for the first time in 2008 in the US.

Production
Sounding the Seventh Trumpet was recorded in eight days in November 2000, with a budget of only $2,000. When the band members got into the studio, The Rev recorded all the drums in one take, and the other members of the band added their parts to what he had laid down. Zacky Vengeance played lead guitar originally. When Synyster Gates joined the band in early 2001, they recorded a heavy metal version of "To End the Rapture", with Gates playing lead guitar. This version was first seen on the Warmness on the Soul single, and was later featured on the re-release of Sounding the Seventh Trumpet. This is the only album to feature bassist Justin Sane, who is also credited as playing piano in the original releases. He was briefly replaced by Dameon Ash as a touring bassist during the album's touring cycle, who was then replaced by Johnny Christ.

Release
The release date of this album's initial version is theorized in many sources. On the band's official website, it is given as January 31, 2001. However, on archived versions of the website, news updates explain that the album, distributed by Lumberjack Distributions, was originally planned for a late April 2001 release. Due to unknown reasons, it had to be pushed back multiple times, at first for a June 10, then for a June 20 release. A Loudwire article about the album's 17th anniversary gives July 24 as the actual release date. It was later rereleased on March 19, 2002.

Reception

Sounding the Seventh Trumpet received mixed to positive reviews from critics. AllMusic rated the album three stars out of five and wrote: "Sounding the Seventh Trumpet is a magnificent album that is suitable for any fan of metal music, as Avenged Sevenfold has a firm grasp on all that is extreme." The review also praised the tracks "Darkness Surrounding" and "We Come out at Night" as being "...excellent metalcore masterpieces, as the vocal harmonies add to these cuts to evolve the songs into fully atmospheric sonic blasts."

Videography
Avenged Sevenfold later released the Warmness on the Soul, which featured a video for the single "Warmness on the Soul". The video depicted the band wandering through city streets as M. Shadows' wife, Valary, searches for them.

Track listing
All songs are written by Avenged Sevenfold, except where noted.

* The Hopeless Records rerelease features a heavy metal version of "To End the Rapture", featuring new bandmate Synyster Gates on lead guitar.

Personnel
Avenged Sevenfold
 M. Shadows – vocals, acoustic guitar, keyboards
 Zacky Vengeance – guitar
 The Rev – drums, backing vocals, sound effects, piano
 Justin Sane – bass, piano
 Synyster Gates – lead guitar and backing vocals on reissue's "To End the Rapture"

Session musicians 
 Valary DiBenedetto – additional vocals on "The Art of Subconscious Illusion"

Production
 Recorded at Westbeach in Hollywood, California
 Produced, engineered, and mixed by Donnell Cameron and Avenged Sevenfold
 Assistant engineering by Henrah Kruzchev
 Mastered by Ramon Breton and Avenged Sevenfold at Oceanview Mastering

References

Avenged Sevenfold albums
2001 debut albums
Hopeless Records albums
Good Life Recordings albums
Skate punk albums